Ondřej Vitásek (born September 4, 1990) is a Czech professional ice hockey defenceman. He is currently playing with HC Bílí Tygři Liberec of the Czech Extraliga (ELH).

Playing career
Vitásek made his Czech Extraliga debut playing with HC Vitkovice during the 2009–10 Czech Extraliga season.

In the 2018–19 season, having joined Chinese club Kunlun Red Star of the KHL on a one-year deal, Vitásek compiled a career-high 13 assists and 16 points from the blueline in 43 regular season games.

On 1 May 2019, Vitásek opted to continue in the KHL, signing on the opening day of free agency to a two-year contract with Russian outfit, Amur Khabarovsk. In the following 2019–20 season, Vitásek contributed with 5 goals and 12 points in 55 regular season games, unable to help propel Amur to the post-season.

On 15 July 2020, Vitásek's remaining year of his contract was mutually terminated with Amur Khabarovsk, releasing him to free agency. He was later signed to a one-year contract to continue in the KHL with Latvian based club, Dinamo Riga, on 12 August 2020.

Career statistics

Regular season and playoffs

International

References

External links

1990 births
Living people
Amur Khabarovsk players
Czech ice hockey defencemen
HC Bílí Tygři Liberec players
Dinamo Riga players
HC Kunlun Red Star players
Ice hockey players at the 2018 Winter Olympics
Olympic ice hockey players of the Czech Republic
HC Vítkovice players
HC Yugra players
Sportspeople from Prostějov
HC Slezan Opava players
HC Benátky nad Jizerou players
Czech expatriate ice hockey players in Russia
Czech expatriate ice hockey people
Czech expatriate sportspeople in China
Czech expatriate sportspeople in Latvia
Expatriate ice hockey players in China
Expatriate ice hockey players in Latvia